The following table indicates the party of elected officials in the U.S. state of Arkansas:
Governor
Lieutenant Governor
Secretary of State
Attorney General
State Auditor
State Treasurer
State Land Commissioner

The table also indicates the historical party composition in the:
State Senate
State House of Representatives
State delegation to the United States Senate
State delegation to the United States House of Representatives

For years in which a United States presidential election was held, the table indicates which party's nominees received the state's electoral votes.

Pre-statehood (1819–1836)

1836–1874

1874–1926

1927–present

See also
 Law and government in Arkansas

Notes

Politics of Arkansas
Government of Arkansas
Arkansas